Zhaksybek Kulekeyev (also transcribed: Zhaksybek Kulekeev and Jaksybek Koulekeiev; in ) is the first deputy CEO of KazMunayGas. He was born on 24 July 1957 in Bostandyk, Zhambyl Province. In 1979 he graduated from the mathematical faculty of Kazakh state university. In 1979-1992 he worked in the Almaty Institute of National Economy and in 1992–1995 in the Kazakh State Economic University.

In 1995-1997 Zhaksybek Kulekeyev served as the first vice-president of Kazakhstan State Committee of Statistics and Analysis and in 1997–1999 as the Chairman of Kazakhstan Agency of Statistics.

In 1999-2000 Zhaksybek Kulekeyev was Minister of Economics, in 2000–2002 Minister of Economics and Trade, in 2002-2003 Chairman of Accounting Committee, and in 2003-2004 Minister of Education and Sciences.

In 2005-2006 Zhaksybek Kulekeyev was Rector of State Management Academy. Since January 2006 he works at KazMunayGas.
Zhaksybek Kulekeyev is married and has one daughter and one son.

References

External links
Biography of Zhaksybek Kulekeyev, KazMunayGas website

Living people
1957 births
Kazakhstani businesspeople
Government ministers of Kazakhstan